This is the discography for American alternative rock band Toad the Wet Sprocket.

Albums

Studio albums

Compilation albums

Live albums and EPs

Singles

References 

Discographies of American artists
Alternative rock discographies